Bilohirsk (until 1944 – Karasubazar, ;) is a town and the administrative centre in Belohirsk Raion, one of the raions (districts) of the Autonomous Republic of Crimea, which is recognised by a majority of countries as part of Ukraine, but is occupied by Russia. Population: 

The city is located 25 miles east-northeast of Simferopol on the Biiuk Karasu river. The city's both Russian and Ukrainian names literally are translated as "white mountains", and the Crimean Tatar name Qarasuvbazar means "bazaar on the Karasu river".

History

The site is low, but the town is surrounded by hills, which afford protection from the north wind. The town has a characteristic Crimean Tatar atmosphere. Placed on the high road between Simferopol and Kerch, and in the midst of a country rich in cereal land, vineyards and gardens, Qarasubazar ('black water market')  used to be a chief seat of commercial activity in Crimea; including a large slave market  but it is gradually declining in importance, though still a considerable centre for the export of fruit.

The caves of Akkaya close by give evidence of early occupation of the area. When in 1736 Khan Fetih Giray was driven by the Russian Empire from Bakhchysarayi, he settled at Karasubazar, but next year the town was captured, plundered and burned by the Russian army.

Retreating NKVD shot a number of local people in the streets in 1941. Qarasuvbazar was occupied by the German army from 1941 to 1944 during World War II. During the occupation, the Germans executed the town's Jews in an anti-tank trench.

After the deportation of the Crimean Tatars, the town was renamed Belogorsk per Stalinist detatarization policy.

Climate

References

External links
 jewishgen.org
 The murder of the Jews of Qarasuvbazar during World War II, at Yad Vashem website.

Cities in Crimea
Bilohirsk Raion
Crimean Khanate
Cities of district significance in Ukraine
Holocaust locations in Ukraine